KVH may refer to:

 Kendriya Vidyalaya Hebbal, a school in Bangalore, India
 KVH Co. Ltd., a Japanese company

See also
 KHV (disambiguation)